Sufilar (also Romanized as Şūfīlār) is a village in Qaranqu Rural District, in the Central District of Hashtrud County, East Azerbaijan Province, Iran. At the 2006 census, its population was 300, in 54 families.

References 

Towns and villages in Hashtrud County